"Where no man has gone before" is a phrase made popular through its use in the title sequence of the original 1966–1969 Star Trek science fiction television series, describing the mission of the starship Enterprise. The complete introductory speech, spoken by William Shatner as Captain James T. Kirk at the beginning of each episode, is:

This introduction began every episode of the series except the two pilot episodes: "The Cage" (which preceded Shatner's involvement) and "Where No Man Has Gone Before".

This introduction was used for the beginning of each episode of the show Star Trek: The Next Generation, but with the phrase "Its five-year mission" changed to "Its continuing mission" (to reflect the on-going mission) and the final phrase changed to the gender-neutral "where no one has gone before". The complete introduction, spoken by Patrick Stewart as Captain Jean-Luc Picard at the beginning of each episode, is: 

A version of the Prologue was also spoken at the end of the Star Trek: Enterprise series finale, "These Are the Voyages...," by the captains of the three starships that share the name Enterprise. Patrick Stewart spoke the first two sentences, William Shatner the third and fourth, and Scott Bakula, as Captain Jonathan Archer, the final sentence.

The Prologue would return in the opening sequence for the Star Trek: Discovery spinoff series Star Trek: Strange New Worlds as spoken by Kirk's predecessor Captain Christopher Pike, portrayed by Anson Mount. Pike's version is the same as Kirk's with the only variance being the usage of the gender-neutral final phrase.

Origin
Blogger Dwayne A. Day says the quotation was taken from Introduction to Outer Space, a White House booklet published in 1958 to garner support for a national space program in the wake of the Sputnik flight. It read on page 1:
The first of these factors is the compelling urge of man to explore and to discover, the thrust of curiosity that leads men to try to go where no one has gone before. Most of the surface of the earth has now been explored and men now turn to the exploration of outer space as their next objective.

Following an early expedition to Newfoundland, Captain James Cook declared that he intended to go not only "... , but as far as I think it is possible for a man to go" (emphasis added). Cook's most famous ship, the Endeavour, lent its name to the last-produced Space Shuttle, much as the Star Trek starship Enterprise lent its name to the Shuttle program's test craft.

Similar expressions have been used in literature before 1958. For example, H. P. Lovecraft's novella The Dream-Quest of Unknown Kadath, written in 1927 and published in 1943, includes this passage:
At length, sick with longing for those glittering sunset streets and cryptical hill lanes among ancient tiled roofs, nor able sleeping or waking to drive them from his mind, Carter resolved to go with bold entreaty whither no man had gone before, and dare the icy deserts through the dark to where unknown Kadath, veiled in cloud and crowned with unimagined stars, holds secret and nocturnal the onyx castle of the Great Ones.

In-universe, the sentence was attributed in the Star Trek: Enterprise pilot episode "Broken Bow" to warp drive inventor Dr. Zefram Cochrane in a recorded speech during the dedication of the facility devoted to designing the first engine capable of reaching Warp 5 (thus making interstellar exploration practical for humans) in the year 2119, some thirty-two years before the 2151 launch of the first vessel powered by such an engine, the Enterprise (NX-01):

Evolution of the quotation

The phrase was first introduced into Star Trek by Samuel Peeples, who is attributed with suggesting it be used as an episode name. The episode became "Where No Man Has Gone Before", the second pilot of Star Trek. The phrase itself was subsequently worked into the show's opening narration, which was written after the episode. Indeed, the introductory sequence was devised in August 1966, after several episodes had been filmed, and shortly before the series was due to debut. It is the result of the combined input of several people, including Star Trek creator Gene Roddenberry and producers John D. F. Black and Bob Justman. Roddenberry's original narrative is as follows:
This is the adventure of the United Space Ship Enterprise. Assigned a five-year galaxy patrol, the bold crew of the giant starship explores the excitement of strange new worlds, uncharted civilizations, and exotic people. These are its voyages and its adventures.
Under their influence, the above narrative quote went through several revisions before being selected for use in the TV series.

The words "no one" were substituted for the original sequence's "no man" in the conclusion of Star Trek VI: The Undiscovered Country as a gender- and species-neutral quote in conjunction to the peace treaty between the Klingons and Federation at the end of the movie. This alternate wording had already been in use in the introductory sequence for Star Trek: The Next Generation.

The quote was used in the 2009 Star Trek reboot film series, at the end of each film. In the 2009 film reboot of Star Trek, the word "ongoing" is used in place of "continuing" and the words "life forms" in place of "life". The quote is spoken by Spock Prime in Star Trek, Kirk in Star Trek Into Darkness and by Kirk, Spock, Scotty, Bones, Sulu, Chekov, and Uhura in Star Trek Beyond; the latter used the same monologue used for The Next Generation.

Leonard Nimoy also delivers a slightly altered version of the monologue at the end of Star Trek II: The Wrath of Khan. In this case, the description of the crew’s mission was expanded to include the search not just for new life, but for "new life forms".  The original statement, "These are the voyages of the starship Enterprise" are augmented as "These are the continuing voyages of the starship Enterprise."  The segment that follows, usually stated, "Its five-year mission" is changed to "Her ongoing mission" presumably so that the word "continuing" is not used twice in two sentences so close to each other.

Outside Star Trek
The quotation has also gained popularity outside Star Trek. In 1989, NASA used the phrase to title its retrospective of Project Apollo: Where No Man Has Gone Before: A History of Apollo Lunar Exploration Missions.

The phrase has become a snowclone, a rhetorical device and type of word play in which one word within it is replaced while maintaining the overall structure. For example, a 2002 episode of Futurama that dealt with a character's devotion to Star Trek is named "Where No Fan Has Gone Before", a level in the video game Teenage Mutant Ninja Turtles: Turtles in Time is called "Starbase: Where No Turtle Has Gone Before". The Italian astronaut Samantha Cristoforetti became the first barista in space on the International Space Station, tweeting "To Boldly Brew..." in May 2015; she wore Star Trek garb for the occasion.

The phrase was parodied on the retail box of the 1987 computer game Space Quest: The Sarien Encounter, which read "His mission: to scrub dirty decks...to replace burned-out lightbulbs...TO BOLDLY GO WHERE NO MAN HAS SWEPT THE FLOOR!" (emphasis original). In 1992, Apple's Star Trek project, a port of their Mac OS 7 operating system to Intel x86 processors, was referred to as "the OS that boldly goes where everyone else has been". In the sci-fi show Babylon 5, the character Susan Ivanova implies that a woman is promiscuous by telling Captain John Sheridan, "Good luck, Captain. I think you're about to go where... everyone has gone before."

The split infinitive "to boldly go" has also been the subject of jokes regarding its grammatical correctness. British humorist and science-fiction author Douglas Adams describes, in his series The Hitchhiker's Guide to the Galaxy, the long-lost heroic age of the Galactic Empire, when bold adventurers dared "to boldly split infinitives that no man had split before". In the 1995 book The Physics of Star Trek, Lawrence M. Krauss begins a list of Star Trek's ten worst errors by quoting one of his colleagues who considers that their greatest mistake is "to split an infinitive every damn time".

See also
 Cultural influence of Star Trek
 Mission statement

References

External links

Star Trek sayings
English phrases
Mottos
Film and television opening sequences
Snowclones
1966 neologisms
Catchphrases